Joaquín Peiró Lucas (29 January 1936 – 18 March 2020) was a Spanish football attacking midfielder and manager.

After excelling at Atlético Madrid – where he would start and end his professional career, amassing La Liga totals of 166 games and 95 goals over eight seasons – he moved to Italy where he would remain for nearly one decade, in representation of three teams. He represented the Spain national team in two World Cups.

Starting in 1978 and for almost 30 years, Peiró worked as a coach before retiring.

Playing career

Club
Born in Madrid, Peiró made his senior debut with Real Murcia on loan from hometown's Atlético Madrid, playing 16 complete La Liga matches with the latter side in the 1955–66 season to help them finish in fifth position, and subsequently becoming first-choice. He was an essential attacking unit as the club won the 1961–62 European Cup Winners' Cup, scoring in both matches of the final against ACF Fiorentina (1–1 in the first game, 3–0 in the replay).

In 1962, after more than 100 official goals for Atlético – he still started the 1962–63 campaign, netting six times in only three games – Peiró moved to Italy and joined Torino FC, becoming the second Spaniard to play in Serie A after Luis Suárez, whom he later teamed up with at Inter Milan, being part of the Grande Inter side that won the 1965 European Cup under manager Helenio Herrera; in the semi-finals against Liverpool, he scored one in a 3–0 home win after a 3–1 loss at Anfield.

Peiró's longest spell in Italy would be spent with A.S. Roma where he won one Italian Cup, eventually also being named team captain.

International
Peiró earned 12 caps for Spain over a period of ten years, scoring five times. He participated in the 1962 FIFA World Cup in Chile, netting the only goal in the match against Mexico, and in the 1966 World Cup in England; both tournaments ended in group-stage elimination.

On 3 June 1956, aged just 20, Peiró made his international debut, scoring in a 3–1 friendly defeat to Portugal in Lisbon.

International goals

Coaching career
Peiró started coaching in 1978, with Atlético's reserves, which he led to the second division two years later. Subsequently, he spent some time managing in the second and third levels, promoting Granada CF to the former.

In 1989–90, Peiró was one of three coaches used by Atlético Madrid, as elusive Jesús Gil was the club's president – the side did finish fourth in the league. He resumed his career in division two, interspersed with periods of inactivity.

Peiró's biggest success as a manager came with Málaga CF, which he led to the top flight in 1999 at the age of 63. Subsequently, the Andalusians won the 2002 UEFA Intertoto Cup and reached the quarter-finals of the following UEFA Cup.

Peiró last coached in 2003, being fired midway through the 2003–04 season from Real Murcia who were relegated from the top tier, as last.

Death
After years struggling with health problems, Peiró died in Madrid at the age of 84.

Honours

Player
Murcia
Segunda División: 1954–55

Atlético Madrid
Copa del Generalísimo: 1959–60, 1960–61
UEFA Cup Winners' Cup: 1961–62

Inter
Serie A: 1964–65, 1965–66
European Cup: 1964–65
Intercontinental Cup: 1964, 1965

Roma
Coppa Italia: 1968–69

Manager
Málaga
Segunda División: 1998–99
UEFA Intertoto Cup: 2002

References

External links

1936 births
2020 deaths
Footballers from Madrid
Spanish footballers
Association football midfielders
La Liga players
Segunda División players
Atlético Madrid footballers
Real Murcia players
Serie A players
Torino F.C. players
Inter Milan players
A.S. Roma players
UEFA Champions League winning players
Spain under-21 international footballers
Spain B international footballers
Spain international footballers
1962 FIFA World Cup players
1966 FIFA World Cup players
Spanish expatriate footballers
Expatriate footballers in Italy
Spanish expatriate sportspeople in Italy
Spanish football managers
La Liga managers
Segunda División managers
Segunda División B managers
Atlético Madrid B managers
Granada CF managers
UE Figueres managers
Atlético Madrid managers
Real Murcia managers
CD Badajoz managers
Málaga CF managers